Betty Ann Ong (Taishanese Ang4 ngut4 mi3; February 5, 1956 – September 11, 2001) was an American flight attendant who worked for American Airlines and boarded Flight 11, the first airplane hijacked during the September 11 attacks. Ong was the first person to alert authorities to the hijackings taking place that day. Shortly after the hijacking, Ong notified the American Airlines ground crew of the hijacking, staying on the radiophone for 25 minutes to relay vital information that led to the closing of airspace by the FAA, a first in United States history. For this, the 9/11 Commission declared Ong a hero.

Personal life
Betty Ann Ong was born on February 5, 1956, in San Francisco. She was of Kaiping descent, a branch of Sze Yup Cantonese (Taishanese), and had two sisters, one of whom was named Cathie, and a brother named Harry. Among her hobbies as an adult was collecting Beanie Babies.

Betty was once approached for work in modeling, but her mother disapproved of that career choice, so instead Ong would work at her parents' beef jerky factory. According to an account related by her sister Cathie Ong-Herrera in New York Post, an armed robbery at the factory illustrated Ong's steady nerves in a crisis situation. As Cathie described it, "Betty was out in front and had a gun held to her head. My mom said she never panicked. All she said was, 'Dad, we’re being robbed.'" The robbers were given the money they demanded and Cathie said of her sister, "She was never shook up."

In 1987, Betty was driving south on U.S. Highway 101 in San Francisco when she witnessed a car roll over twice after it was hit by a speeding pickup truck. Betty ran to the car and saw that its occupant was Jo Ellen Chew, a woman she met a month prior at a bowling alley, who later described the "courage, kindness, [and] compassion" exhibited by Ong, saying, "Most people would just pass by. But to stop and run up to me? A miracle!"

Ong was engaged to Robert Landrum.

Flight 11 and death
On September 11, 2001, Ong assigned herself to Flight 11, so she could return to Los Angeles and go on vacation to Hawaii with her sister. During the hijacking, she used a telephone card to call American Airlines' operations/Raleigh reservations center, from the plane's rear galley; identified herself and alerted the supervisor that the aircraft had been hijacked. Along with fellow flight attendant Madeline Amy Sweeney, she relayed a report of the seat numbers of three hijackers. During her Airfone call, she reported that none of the crew could contact the cockpit nor open its door; that passenger Daniel M. Lewin, and two flight attendants, Karen Martin and Bobbi Arestegui, had been stabbed; and that she thought someone had sprayed Mace in the business class cabin. At the time of her death, Ong lived in Andover, Massachusetts.

Phone call
Transcript of the 8-minute 26-second conversation between Ong, American Airlines' operations/Raleigh reservations, Nydia Gonzalez (Operations Specialist on duty on September 11) and American Airlines' emergency line, beginning with Ong in mid-sentence, her voice audible only during its first four minutes:

Legacy

On September 21, 2001, some 200 members of the Chinese American community in San Francisco gathered in a small park to pay tribute to Ong. Mayor of San Francisco Willie Brown, who was present, gave a proclamation honoring the people who died in the tragedy and called September 21 "Betty Ong Day".

In 2002, Ong, Sweeney and Flight 11 Captain John Ogonowski were the inaugural recipients of the Madeline Amy Sweeney Award for Civilian Bravery, an honor that the Government of Massachusetts instituted to award annually at least one Massachusetts resident for displaying extraordinary courage in defending or saving the lives of others.

In March 2002, Ong's remains were recovered from Ground Zero and identified. She was cremated and her ashes were buried at Cypress Lawn Memorial Park in Colma, California.

In 2011, the recreation center in San Francisco's Chinatown where she had played as a child was renamed in her honor, as the Betty Ann Ong Chinese Recreation Center.

Ong's name is located on Panel N-74 of the National September 11 Memorial's North Pool, along with those of other passengers of Flight 11.

Ong is memorialized on Gold Mountain, a mural dedicated to Chinese contributions to American history on Romolo Place in North Beach, a street where she used to skateboard and play as a child.

The Betty Ann Ong Foundation was founded to honor Ong's interest in the welfare of children, by providing, in the words of board member David Huff, "training and guidance on nutrition, health, physical activities, leadership skills, critical thinking skills, planning, group and team activities, and community awareness and cohesiveness". Among its activities are contributions to groups including the Bakersfield Police Activities League and Betty Ann Ong Chinese Recreation Center in San Francisco's Chinatown. In March 2013, the foundation publicly opposed the decision of the Transportation Security Administration to allow knives with blades up to 2.36 inches long back onto aircraft for the first time since the 9/11 attacks. Ong's sister, Cathie Ong-Herrera, speaking as the president and CEO of the foundation, stated, "The horrific events that took place on the morning of September 11, 2001 began with the takeover of American Airlines Flight 11. Terrorists took control of the aircraft by first fatally stabbing two flight attendants with box-cutters. My sister, flight attendant Betty Ann Ong, along with the entire flight crew and passengers were murdered. There are no words to describe the gut-wrenching pain and grief our family has experienced—things that no other family should ever have to endure. I support the Coalition of Flight Attendant Unions' position to reverse the TSA's decision to allow knives and other dangerous objects on aircraft because it's about everyone's safety." The foundation was among a coalition of groups opposed to the move by the TSA, which abandoned the plan as a result.

In media
Ong was played by Jean Yoon in the 2006 ABC miniseries The Path to 9/11, and by Jane Zhang in episode two of the 2004 BBC docudrama Zero Hour.

An extensive clip from Ong's call to headquarters was used for the beginning of the 2012 film Zero Dark Thirty. The clip was used without attribution, and without the consent of Ong's family and the airline. They requested that Sony Pictures Entertainment, the film's U.S. distributor, make a charitable donation in her name, credit her onscreen, state the Ong family does not endorse torture (which the film depicts being used in the manhunt for Osama bin Laden) on its website and in home entertainment versions of the film, and acknowledge these things during the 85th Academy Awards ceremony.

See also
 History of Chinese Americans in San Francisco

References

External links

 
 
 . June 23, 2007
 

American Airlines Flight 11 victims
1956 births
2001 deaths
American people of Chinese descent
People from Andover, Massachusetts
People from San Francisco
Flight attendants
American Airlines people
American terrorism victims